Philip Leach is professor of human rights law at Middlesex University and director of the European Human Rights Advocacy Centre. In 2015, Leach was named Human Rights Lawyer of the Year at the Law Society of England and Wales's annual Excellence Awards.

He is a member of the Advisory Board of the Open Society Justice Initiative,  and vice-chair of the European Implementation Network.

References

External links 
What is Justice? | Professor Philip Leach's inaugural lecture.
https://mdx.academia.edu/PhilipLeach

Academics of Middlesex University
Living people
British solicitors
Year of birth missing (living people)